The Glenn L. Jackson Memorial Bridge, or I-205 Bridge, is a segmental bridge that spans the Columbia River between  Portland, Oregon and Vancouver, Washington. It carries Interstate 205, a freeway bypass of Portland, Oregon.

Planning for the structure began in earnest in 1964 when it was designated as part of the East Portland Freeway (later renamed Veteran's Memorial Freeway), Interstate 205. Construction began in August 1977. In order to avoid disrupting river traffic, the bridge was built one segment at a time. The bridge was opened on December 15, 1982. The finished project cost was $169.6 million: $155.7 million from Federal funds, $4 million from Washington state funds and $9.9 million from Oregon state funds. Three men died during its construction. The bridge was closed to traffic on May 15, 1983, for a one-day festival named "People's Day", where 125,000 pedestrians crossed the bridge.

It is a twin structure with four lanes in each direction and a  bicycle and pedestrian path in between. The bridge was named for Glenn Jackson, the chairman of the Oregon State Highway Commission and later the Oregon Economic Development Commission.

The average weekday traffic during 2019 was 166,152 vehicles. In 2020, ODOT and WSDOT began a one-year pilot project to allow C-Tran buses to use the shoulders of I-205 over the bridge in order to bypass congestion.

No vehicle, bicycle or pedestrian access to Government Island is available from the bridge.

Multi-use path

A multi-use path for pedestrians and cyclists runs along the center of the bridge. This multi-use path connects to two trailheads at each end of the bridge as well as the I-205 Trail through Portland. The path lacks access to Government Island.

See also

References

External links

Bridges completed in 1982
Jackson
Bridges over the Columbia River
Bridges in Vancouver, Washington
Monuments and memorials in Oregon
Monuments and memorials in Washington (state)
Road bridges in Oregon
Road bridges in Washington (state)
Interstate 5
Bridges on the Interstate Highway System
1982 establishments in Oregon
1982 establishments in Washington (state)
Concrete bridges in the United States
Northeast Portland, Oregon